was a Japanese Confucian. He learned Yangmingism from Nakae Tōju and served Ikeda Mitsumasa, the lord of Bizen Province. In his later years, he was imprisoned for writing Daigaku Wakumon, which contained criticism of Tokugawa shogunate politics.

Name 
His surname "Kumazawa" (熊沢) was changed to that of "Shigeyama" (蕃山) in 1660 and the latter, read in Sino-Japanese as "Banzan", became his posthumous courtesy title, by which even now he is commonly known.

Yōmeigaku 
Yōmeigaku is the Japanese term for a school of Neo-Confucianism associated with its founder, the Chinese philosopher Wang Yangming, characterised by introspection and activism, and which exercised a profound influence on Japanese revisions of Confucian political and moral theory in Japan during the Edo period.

Life

Early life
He was born in Kyoto Inari (now Shimogyō-ku, Kyoto), the eldest son of six children. His father, a rōnin, was called  and his mother was called . At the age of eight, he was adopted by his maternal grandfather, a samurai serving under Tokugawa Yorifusa, the daimyō of Mito, and took from him the surname of Kumazawa.

Leaving to study under Nakae Tōju
He left the Ikeda household for a time, returning to his grandfather's home in Kirihara, Ōmi Province (now Ōmihachiman).

Time in the Okayama Domain
In 1645, again with the recommendation of the Kyōgoku family, he went to work in the Okayama Domain. As Mitsumasa's thinking leaned towards Yōmeigaku, he made much use of Banzan, valuing him for having studied under Tōju. Banzan worked mainly in the Han school called , whose name means "Flowerfield Teaching Place". This school opened in 1641, making it one of the first in Japan. In 1649 he went with Mitsumasa to Edo.

This was the initial incarnation of the first school in Japan for educating commoners,  which opened in 1670, after Banzan had left the service of his domain. In 1654, when the Bizen plains were assailed by floods and large-scale famine, he put all his energies into assisting Mitsumasa with relief efforts. He worked to produce fully developed strategies on agriculture, including ways of providing relief to small-scale farmers and land engineering projects to manage mountains and rivers. However, his daring reforms of domain government brought him into opposition with the traditionalist . In addition, while Banzan was a follower of Yōmeigaku, the official philosophy of the Edo shogunate was a different form of Neo-Confucianism, . In fact, Banzan was the first in a series of notable neo-Confucianists who would find themselves confronting the evolving critical powers of the Hayashi clan of scholars.

The name "Banzan" derives from the word "Shigeyama".

Time out of power and later life
Eventually, in 1657, unable to withstand the pressure from the shogunate and the domain leaders, he left Okayama Domain.

In 1658, he moved to Kyoto and opened a private juku (school).

In 1667, he escaped to Yoshinoyama, Yamato Province (now Yoshino, Nara). After serving the Okayama District, in his days outside public service, he often wrote, and criticised the policies of the shogunate, particularly ,  (the policy forbidding those outside the samurai class to arm themselves), and the hereditary system. He was also critical of the government of Okayama Domain.

Banzan's goal was to reform the Japanese government by advocating the adoption of a political system based on merit rather than heredity and the employment of political principles to reinforce the merit system.

In 1691 the rebellious Confucian became ill and died within Koga Castle at the age of 74.

After his death

In the Bakumatsu period, Banzan's philosophy came back into the spotlight, greatly influencing the structure of government. Katsu Kaishū praised Banzan as "a hero in Confucian robes".

Outside the realm of politics, Banzan would in time become something of a cultural hero because, while attending to actions and words which demonstrated an enduring concern for commoners and the poor.  He was praised for resistance to the imposition of corrupt politics and bureaucratic burdens on ordinary people.

Writings

Lineage 

 —  —  — Banzan

 —  —   —   —  — Banzan

See also
 Kobe temple -- 
 List of Confucianists

References

 Collins, Randall. (1998). The Sociology of Philosophies: A Global Theory of Intellectual Change. Cambridge: Harvard University Press.   (cloth)  (paper)
 McMullen, James. (1999). Idealism, Protest and the Tale of Genji: The Confucianism of Kumazawa Banzan (1619-91). Oxford: Oxford University Press.  (cloth)
 Najita, Tetsuo. (1980). Japan: The Intellectual Foundations of Modern Japanese Politics. Chicago: University of Chicago Press.  
 Much of this article was translated from the equivalent article in the Japanese Wikipedia, as retrieved on November 25, 2006.

External links
 Samurai Archives
 East Asia Institute, University of Cambridge: Further reading/bibliography

Okayama Prefecture
Japanese Confucianists
17th-century Japanese philosophers
1619 births
1691 deaths
People from Kyoto
Japanese writers of the Edo period